Antonio Lupatelli (1930 – 18 May 2018) was an Italian illustrator, comics artist  and writer who worked under the pseudonym of Tony Wolf.
Lupatelli is best known for his illustrations of children's books, including his work in:
 Pinocchio, Dami Editore Firenze, 2002
 Le Storie del Bosco, (The Woodland Folk series, which he also wrote)
 On the Farm, Running Press Kids, 2005
 In the City, Running Press Kids, Brdbk edition, 2005
 Jack and Jill
He also made graphic contributions to the book adaptations of the Swiss claymation TV series Pingu.

Lupatelli worked with Fratelli Fabbri Editori, Payot Film, Fleetway Publications, and Dami Editore. As a comics artist he was one of several artist to draw for Fleetway's children's magazines Playhour and Jack and Jill. Among the series he worked on were Freddie Frog, Fun in Toyland, Little Sooty and Moony of the Moon.
In the Italian magazine Il Corriere dei Piccoli he created Ciccio Sprai and Robi e Robo.

He died in Italy on 18 May 2018.

References

1930 births
2018 deaths
Italian children's book illustrators
Italian comics artists
People from Busseto